A C-type lectin (CLEC) is a type of carbohydrate-binding protein known as a lectin. The C-type designation is from their requirement for calcium for binding. Proteins that contain C-type lectin domains have a diverse range of functions including cell-cell adhesion, immune response to pathogens and apoptosis.

Classification

Drickamer et al. classified C-type lectins into 7 subgroups (I to VII) based on the order of the various protein domains in each protein. This classification was subsequently updated in 2002, leading to seven additional groups (VIII to XIV). Most recently, three further subgroups were added (XV to XVII).

CLECs include:

 CLEC1A, CLEC1B
 CLEC2A, CLEC2B, CD69 (CLEC2C), CLEC2D, CLEC2L
 CLEC3A, CLEC3B
 CLEC4A, CLEC4C, CLEC4D, CLEC4E, CLEC4F, CLEC4G, ASGR1 (CLEC4H1), ASGR2 (CLEC4H2), FCER2 (CLEC4J), CD207 (CLEC4K), CD209 (CLEC4L), CLEC4M
 CLEC5A
 CLEC6A
 CLEC7A
 OLR1 (CLEC8A)
 CLEC9A
 CLEC10A
 CLEC11A
 CLEC12A, CLEC12B
 CD302 (CLEC13A), LY75 (CLEC13B), PLA2R1 (CLEC13C), MRC1 (CLEC13D), MRC2 (CLEC13E)
 CLEC14A
 CLEC16A
 CLEC17A

The "NK Cell lectin-like receptors" are a very closely related group:
 KLRA1
 KLRB1 (CLEC5B)
 KLRC1, KLRC2, KLRC3, KLRC4
 KLRD1
 KLRF1 (CLEC5C)
 KLRG1 (CLEC15A), KLRG2 (CLEC15B)
 KLRK1

Additional proteins containing this domain include:

 AGC1; ATRNL1
 BCAN
 CD248; CD72; CD93; CHODL; CL-K1-Ia; CL-K1-Ib; CL-K1-Ic; CLECSF5; COLEC10; COLEC11; COLEC12; CSPG3
 FCER2; FREM1; HBXBP;
 LAYN; LOC348174; LOC728276
 MAFA; MBL2; MGC34761; MICL; MRC1L1
 OLR1
 PAP; PKD1; PKD1L2; PLA2R1; PRG2; PRG3
 REG1A; REG1B; REG3A; REG3G; REG4
 SELE; SELL; SELP; SFTPA1; SFTPA2; SFTPA2B; SFTPD; SRCL
 THBD
 VCAN

References

External links
 Functional Glycomics Gateway, a collaboration between the Consortium for Functional Glycomics and Nature Publishing Group

 
Human proteins
Protein domains
Single-pass transmembrane proteins